The Deutsche Gesellschaft für Schädlingsbekämpfung mbH, oft shortened to Degesch, was a German chemical corporation which manufactured pesticides. Degesch held the patent on the infamous pesticide Zyklon, a variant of which was used to execute people in the gas chambers of German extermination camps during the Holocaust. Through the firms Tesch & Stabenow GmbH (Testa) and Heerdt-Linger (Heli), Degesch sold the poisonous gas Zyklon B to the German Army and the Schutzstaffel (SS).

Degesch was founded in 1919 as a subsidiary of Degussa. Its first director was chemistry Nobel laureate Fritz Haber. In 1936, Degussa and IG Farben each held 42.5% of the shares, while Th. Goldschmidt AG held the remaining 15%. During the years 1938 through 1943, Degesch was extremely profitable. For most of these years, IG Farben received dividends amounting to twice the value of their shares. After the Second World War Degesch continued production. In 1986 the company was sold to Detia Freyberg GmbH; the current name is Detia-Degesch GmbH.

Prosecution 
During the IG Farben trial the director of Degesch, Gerhard Friedrich Peters, implicated himself. He received information by Kurt Gerstein about the murder of people using Zyklon and was informed that the German army needed the gas without the usual additives that were added to warn people by smell of its poisonous nature (the Zyklon B variant).
In 1949 Peters was charged with murder in the court of Frankfurt and convicted and sentenced to five years imprisonment. The conviction was in 1952 legally confirmed in an appeal and set to six years. Peters went to prison but was acquitted in a new appeal in 1953. The law had changed; he was no longer considered guilty in assisting in murder.

The chairman of the board of directors from 1939 to 1945, Hermann Schlosser, was arrested in February 1948 and acquitted in April 1948; later he took another job as chairman of the board.

An employee Joachim Drosihn was acquitted.

See also 
 German re-armament

References 

Chemical companies of Germany
Defunct companies of Germany
Chemical companies established in 1919
1919 establishments in Germany
Companies involved in the Holocaust